Plácido Rosas is a village or populated centre in the Cerro Largo Department of eastern Uruguay.

Geography
It is located on the north bank of Río Tacuarí, near the bridge Paso del Dragóneast, over which Route 18 crosses the river. The railroad track Montevideo - Nico Pérez - Río Branco passes through the village.

Population
In 2011 Plácido Rosas had a population of 415.
 
Source: Instituto Nacional de Estadística de Uruguay

References

External links
INE map of Plácido Rosas

Populated places in the Cerro Largo Department